Teramo Basket was a professional basketball club that is based in Teramo, Italy. Established in 1960, Teramo played in the Lega Basket Serie A (LBA), Italy's top league, for 10 years before they were moved to the Serie B. The team played at PalaScapriano.

In 2012 the team was dissolved after financial problems.

History
The club was founded by Carlo Antonetti in 1973 under the name AICS (Association of Italian Culture and Sports) Teramo. After several championships played at regional level and successful youth teams, in the 1992-93 season Teramo Basket finally accomplished its first promotion to the national championship series C1. It represented an established basketball team playing in Serie A, the Italian professional basketball league, for 10 seasons consecutively. It ranked #3 in 2009 Italian league enabling the team to play the Eurocup in 2010. Due to a heavy situation of bankruptcy the team folded in July 2012 and disappeared from any basketball league. Teramo Basket had been an important launch pad for both Italian and American players such as Clay Tucker and Jaycee Carroll.

Notable players

Sponsorship names
Through the years, due to sponsorship deals, it had been also known as:

Sanic Teramo (2002–03)
Navigo.it Teramo (2004–06)
Siviglia Wear Teramo (2006–08)
Bancatercas Teramo (2008–present)

References

External links
Official Site 
Official Site 

Defunct basketball teams in Italy
Teramo
Basketball teams established in 1973
Basketball teams disestablished in 2012
Sport in Abruzzo